Beenoskee or Benoskee is a 826 m (2,710 ft) mountain on the Dingle Peninsula in Kerry, Ireland.

Geography 
Beenoskee is part of the Dingle Mountains, and is the highest of the "Central Dingle" group and the 28th highest in Ireland. It is within the Gaeltacht.

Beenoskee is the highest peak of the Central Dingle massif, which also includes the peaks of Stradbally Mountain (798m), Coumbaun (610m) and Beenatoor (592m). Between Beenoskee and Stradbally is a small lake called Loch an Choimín (anglicised Lough Acummeen), which sits at a height of 816m.

See also
Lists of mountains in Ireland
List of mountains of the British Isles by height
List of Marilyns in the British Isles
List of Hewitt mountains in England, Wales and Ireland

References

Hewitts of Ireland
Marilyns of Ireland
Mountains and hills of County Kerry
Gaeltacht places in County Kerry
Mountains under 1000 metres